Double Fattiness is a 1988 Hong Kong comedy film directed by David Chiang and starring Bill Tung, Lydia Shum, Eric Tsang and Maggie Cheung.

Plot
The movie revolved around a Chinese flatbread restaurant in Hong Kong, where the Mo family worked and make a living. Luk Siu-fung (Lydia Shum) is the matriarch of the family, protecting them against all external threats from local gangsters, while also serving the family's every need. However, Siu-fung suffers from heart problems, and on the eve of her wedding anniversary with her longtime husband, Mo Chak-shu, Siu-fung died.

Before Siu-fung died, she expressed a desire to ride a Chinese Wedding Sedan in the afterlife, which Chak-shu and his son, Sonny, promises. When Siu-fung reaches the underworld, the wedding sedan arrived just in time to carry Siu-fung over the Neihe Bridge, where she will officially reach the underworld and be prepared for reincarnation. After proper registrations, Siu-fung (who is grossly overweight) attempted to cross the Neihe Bridge with the sedan, and the excessive weight caused the bridge to collapse. The sedan carriers, along with the sedan, fell to their death into the Neihe River, while Siu-fung was saved by the Spiritworld Keeper at the last moment.

Since the Neihe Bridge was destroyed, Siu-fung cannot cross the bridge, thus creating an anomaly where Siu-fung is not officially dead, in spiritworld terms. The spiritworld keeper attempted to guide Siu-fung back to human life, where she can reenter her body, and be returned to life. However, Siu-fung was a little late, and her husband and son pressed a button to cremate Siu-fung's body.

Cast 
This is a partial list of cast.
 Bill Tung as Mo Chak-shu (武則書)
 Lydia Shum as Luk Siu-fung / Miss Cho
 Eric Tsang as Sonny Mo Tak-ko
 Maggie Cheung as Diana
 Dennis Chan as Spiritworld Keeper
 Paul Chun as Kam Tai-tse
 James Wong as Orchestra Director
 David Chiang as 2nd Spiritworld Keeper
 Ronald Wong as Tse's men
 Teddy Yip as Mr Lin

Character Naming and References
In Cantonese, the name "Mo" (武) is homonymic to the term "no/nothing/never" (無), therefore, Mo Chak-shu (武則書) is phonetically similar to the term "無執輸", which means "Will not lose" or "will not be at a disadvantage". Meanwhile, Mo Tak-ko (武德高) is phonetically similar to "無得高", which means "will never grow tall".

Paul Chun's character, Kam Tai-tse (金大枝) somewhat resembles the transliterated name of the former President of South Korea, Kim Dae-jung.

Mo Tak-ko's purported English name, Charles (as revealed to Diana), is a reference to Charles, Prince of Wales, while Diana's name is a reference to Diana, Princess of Wales.

References

External links 
 
 Double Fattiness at hkcinemagic.com

1988 films
1988 comedy films
Hong Kong slapstick comedy films
Supernatural comedy films
1980s Cantonese-language films
Films set in Hong Kong
Films shot in Hong Kong
1980s supernatural films
Films directed by David Chiang
1980s Hong Kong films